Shades 1968–1998 is a 4 CD-Box-Set by the British hard rock band Deep Purple. It was released on 16 March 1999. It spans their career from 1968 to 1998. This box set contains rare edits and singles which are remastered along with album versions of their biggest hits.

Track listing

Disc one: 1968–1971 
"Hush" – 4:27
"Help!" – 6:03
"Shadows" (Demo 1968) – 3:30
"Love Help Me" (Instrumental Demo 1968) – 3:25
"Kentucky Woman" (Single Version) – 4:14
"Anthem" – 6:32
"River Deep, Mountain High" (Single Version) – 2:37
"Emmaretta" – 3:00
"The Bird Has Flown" (Single Version) – 2:53
"Hallelujah" – 3:47
"Speed King" (Full Length UK Version) – 5:53
"Child in Time" – 10:21
"Cry Free" (Roger Glover remix) – 3:23
"Black Night" (Full-Length U.K.version) – 3:27
"Jam Stew" (Outtake 1970) – 2:33
"Into the Fire" (Live 10/24/1970) – 4:20
"No No No" (Live 9/1971) – 7:16

Disc two: 1971 – 1972
"Strange Kind of Woman" – 4:03
"I'm Alone" – 3:04
"Fireball" – 3:24
"Demon's Eye" – 5:21
"Anyone's Daughter" – 4:45
"Fools" – 8:19
"No One Came" – 6:27
"Freedom" (Outtake 1971) – 3:36
"Slow Train" (Outtake 1971) – 5:35
"Never Before" – 4:02
"When a Blind Man Cries" – 3:34
"Highway Star" – 6:09
"Smoke on the Water" – 5:42
"Pictures of Home" – 5:07
"Space Truckin'" – 4:35
"Painted Horse" (1972 Outtake) – 5:15

Disc three: 1972 – 1976
"Smoke on the Water" (Live 8/15/1972) – 7:13
"Lazy" (Live 8/17/1972) – 10:34
"Woman from Tokyo" – 5:50
"Mary Long" – 4:26
"Super Trouper" – 2:56
"Smooth Dancer" – 4:11
"Burn" – 6:02
"Might Just Take Your Life" – 4:39
"Sail Away" – 5:51
"Coronarias Redig" – 4:55
"Stormbringer" – 4:08
"Hold On" – 5:09
"Lady Double Dealer" (Live 4/5/1975) – 4:17
"Gettin' Tighter" – 3:37
"Comin' Home" – 3:53

Disc four: 1984 – 1998
"Knocking at Your Back Door" – 7:07
"Perfect Strangers" – 5:28
"Son of Alerik" (7″ single Version) – 5:28
"Call of the Wild" – 4:53
"Bad Attitude" (Single Version) – 4:03
"Hard Lovin' Woman" (live 8/22/1987) – 4:05
"Hush '88" (live 2/26/1988) – 3:32
"King of Dreams" (Single Version) – 4:50
"Fire in the Basement" – 4:43
"Slow Down Sister" – 5:58
"The Battle Rages On" – 5:57
"Anya" (live 10/16/1993) – 12:11
"A Castle Full of Rascals" – 5:11
"Seventh Heaven" – 5:23

Personnel
Mk 1: 1968–1969 – Ritchie Blackmore, Rod Evans, Jon Lord, Ian Paice, Nick Simper
Mk 2: 1969–1973 – Ritchie Blackmore, Ian Gillan, Roger Glover, Jon Lord, Ian Paice
Mk 3: 1973–1975 – Ritchie Blackmore, David Coverdale, Glenn Hughes, Jon Lord, Ian Paice
Mk 4: 1975–1976 – Tommy Bolin, David Coverdale, Glenn Hughes, Jon Lord, Ian Paice
Mk 2 (reunion): 1984–1989 – Ritchie Blackmore, Ian Gillan, Roger Glover, Jon Lord, Ian Paice
Mk 5: 1989–1992 – Ritchie Blackmore, Roger Glover, Jon Lord, Ian Paice, Joe Lynn Turner
Mk 2 (second reunion): 1992–1993 – Ritchie Blackmore, Ian Gillan, Roger Glover, Jon Lord, Ian Paice
Mk 6: 1993–1994 – Ian Gillan, Roger Glover, Jon Lord, Ian Paice, Joe Satriani
Mk 7: 1994–2002 – Ian Gillan, Roger Glover, Jon Lord, Steve Morse, Ian Paice

References

1999 compilation albums
Deep Purple compilation albums
Rhino Records compilation albums